Club Atlético Osasuna (Osasuna Athletic Club), or simply Osasuna, is a Spanish professional football club in Pamplona, Navarre. Founded on 24 October 1920, the club currently plays in La Liga, holding home games at the 23,576-capacity El Sadar Stadium. The team's regular home kit is a red shirt with navy blue shorts. Osasuna is one of four professional Spanish clubs to be owned by its members with an elected president.

Osasuna is the sole Navarrese club to have played in La Liga. Although the club has never won a national trophy it reached the Copa del Rey final in 2005. The club’s best league finishes were fourth in 1990–91 and 2005–06.

"Los Rojillos" is the club nickname, meaning "The Little  Reds". The word "osasuna" means "health" in Basque, used in a sense of "strength" or "vigour", which makes Osasuna the only team in La Liga with a Basque name. For different reasons, rivalries exist between Osasuna and Real Zaragoza, Real Madrid, and some Basque clubs, particularly Athletic Bilbao.

Osasuna has a cantera which has produced several successful players similar to other clubs in the greater Basque region.

History

The club was founded on 24 October 1920 and its name, Osasuna, meaning health in Basque, was chosen by Benjamín Andoian Martínez. When Spanish football became professional in 1928, Osasuna was placed in the third division, gaining promotion to the Segunda División after the 1931–32 season by winning the playoff against Nacional de Madrid. They made it to La Liga three seasons later. That same season, they reached the semi-finals of the Copa del Rey and lost to Sevilla. The next season , Osasuna reached the semi-finals again, this time losing to Barcelona over two legs, despite grabbing a victory in the first leg.

The club was hit hard by the rearguard repression implemented by the Nationalist rebels in the 1936 coup-de-état against the Spanish Second Republic. At least ten players, employees and directive board members were murdered, imprisoned or otherwise persecuted. The surviving members were forcibly recruited for the front, with some of them showing enthusiasm for the putsch. The strong support of Navarre for the Nationalist rebels led to Osasuna being offered a place in the 1939–40 La Liga when official competitions resumed, although they had finished last in 1935–36 and should have been relegated; ultimately a play-off was arranged with the other demoted team Atlético Aviación – associated with the Spanish Air Force and thus favoured by the military regime. The Madrid team won the tie and, with support from their powerful backers, went on to claim the league title and retain it. It would not be until 1953–54 that Osasuna again participated in the top division, and 1956–57 when they managed to keep their place among the elite, remaining there for three further years.

In September 1967, Osasuna's El Sadar Stadium was opened with a match between Osasuna and Vitoria de Setubal, with the hosts winning 3–0. The club achieved its first ever UEFA Cup qualification in 1985–86 after finishing sixth in the league; their campaign began in the first round, eliminating Scottish club Rangers before being knocked out by Belgian club Waregem 3–2 on aggregate. In the 1990–91 season, Osasuna finished fourth in the league, their best ever league finish until then. This gave them qualification for the following season's UEFA Cup, where the club reached the third round by eliminating Slavia Sofia and Stuttgart. Finishing last in 1993–94, the side spent six years in the second level, before finally being promoted in 1999–2000 after placing 2nd in the league table.

In the 2002–03 Copa del Rey, Osasuna reached the semi-finals for the first time since 1988. The team entered the competition in the Round of 64, where they beat Lemona. In the following rounds, they beat Eibar, Real Unión and Sevilla, until the semi-finals where they were knocked out after losing to Recreativo de Huelva 4–2 on aggregate.

In 2005, they reached the Copa del Rey final for the first time, losing to Real Betis after extra time. They had a tough campaign in that season's Copa Del Rey, almost being eliminated in the round of 64 but narrowly beating Segunda División B side Castellón on penalties after a goalless draw. They went on to beat Girona 1–0 in extra time, then Getafe, Sevilla and Atletico Madrid each by just one goal difference on aggregate to get to the final.

On 27 November 2005, Osasuna played their 1,000th game in La Liga. After a stellar 2005–06 domestic campaign, they made history by finishing in fourth place – equalling the best-ever finish – to enter the qualifying phase for the UEFA Champions League in the following season. This achievement was made more dramatic by the suspense that was maintained until the last day of the championship in which Osasuna and Sevilla were both vying for fourth place – both eventually ended the season with the same number of points but Osasuna finished higher due to their head-to-head record. However, they did not make it to the Champions League group phase, after being eliminated by Hamburger SV in the third qualifying round, leaving the Navarrese to compete in the UEFA Cup for the fifth time.

Osasuna were drawn in Group D of the 2006–07 UEFA Cup, and qualified for the knockout stage after finishing second in the group. In the Round of 32, they and were drawn against Bordeaux, progressing 1–0 on aggregate, drawing 0–0 away before winning 1–0 in Pamplona through an extra time winner by Javad Nekounam. Osasuna's next opponent was Rangers, and Osasuna again progressed following a 1–1 draw in Glasgow and a 1–0 win at home. The club was drawn against German side Bayer Leverkusen in the quarter-finals. Regarded as severe underdogs, Osasuna not only progressed to the semi-finals but did so in style (a 3–0 away win had virtually sealed the tie, but the Rojillos also won the second leg, 1–0). In the semi-finals, the club was drawn against holders and fellow Spanish side Sevilla, eventually losing 1–2 on aggregate after a 1–0 home win.

In the following two seasons, Osasuna struggled heavily in the league. In 2007–08, they finished 17th and only one point above relegation. In 2008–09, they only avoided relegation in the final day; being in 18th place and entering the final matchday at home to Real Madrid, the club fell behind but came back with two goals (the decider courtesy of Juanfran, a Merengue youth graduate) to beat 9-men Los Blancos and remain in the top flight by finishing 15th.

Osasuna had great success in 2011–12, finishing seventh and one place away from qualifying for the European places, but struggled again in the next 2 seasons, finishing 16th in 2012–13 and being relegated to the second division after an 18th-place finish in 2013–14. In the 2014–15 season, the club managed to end up one position above the relegation zone. A managerial change resulted in substantial improvement, and Osasuna won the final match of the regular 2015–16 season 0–5 away to Oviedo, finishing sixth in the table and qualifying for promotion playoffs and. They subsequently won all the playoff games – against Gimnàstic de Tarragona in the semi-final and Girona in the final – to achieve promotion to La Liga once again. Osasuna finished 2016–17 in 19th position, resulting in relegation. They could only manage 8th in their first campaign back in the second tier.

On 20 May 2019, Osasuna achieved promotion back to La Liga after Granada's victory over Albacete, mathematically ensuring a promotion place with three matches left in the season. On 31 May, they defeated Córdoba to finish as 2018–19 Segunda División champions.

The club celebrated its centenary in October 2020 with a league victory over Athletic Bilbao, albeit the match was played in an empty stadium owing to restrictions caused by the COVID-19 pandemic in Spain. In May 2021, after decades of silence and alongside other Navarrese institutions, club president Luis Sabalza paid homage for the first time to the members who went through the rearguard Nationalist repression during the Spanish Civil War, on behalf of the board of directors.

Kit evolution 
Red and navy blue are the colours of CA Osasuna, reflected in the home kit and club logo. The away kit tends to differ greatly from the home kit.

Rivalries 
Osasuna has many rivalries: these include Real Zaragoza, Real Madrid, and Athletic Bilbao.

The rivalry with Real Madrid began in December 1990, when Osasuna won 4–0 at the Santiago Bernabéu Stadium. The rivalry with Zaragoza wasn't always a heated rivalry, but hostility between the two clubs began during a match in October 1987, when Zaragoza fans threw an object at Osasuna goalkeeper Roberto Santamaría. Since then, these matches often have altercations between fans and players, and it is known to be one of the most heated rivalries in Spain.  In recent years however, there have been large periods of time where this rivalry match wasn't played, due to the clubs being in different divisions.

Seasons

Recent seasons
{|class="wikitable"
|-bgcolor="#efefef"
! Season
! Div
! Pos.
! Pld
! W
! D
! L
! GF
! GA
! GD
! Pts
!Cup
!colspan=2|Europe
!Notes
|-
||2012–13
|1D
|align=right |16th
|align=right|38||align=right|10||align=right|9||align=right|19||align=right|33||align=right|50||alight=right|−17||align=right|39
||Round of 16
|||||
|-
||2013–14
|1D
|align=right |18th
|align=right|38||align=right|10||align=right|9||align=right|19||align=right|32||align=right|62||alight=right|−30||align=right|39
||Round of 16
||||| Relegated
|-
||2014–15
|2D
|align=right |18th
|align=right|42||align=right|11||align=right|12||align=right|19||align=right|41||align=right|60||alight=right|−19||align=right|45
||Second round
|||||
|-
||2015–16
|2D
|align=right |6th
|align=right|42||align=right|17||align=right|13||align=right|12||align=right|47||align=right|40||align=right|+7||align=right|64
||Second round
||||| Promoted as play-off winners
|-
||2016–17
|1D
|align=right |19th
|align=right|38||align=right|4||align=right|10||align=right|24||align=right|40||align=right|94||alight=right|−54||align=right|22
||Round of 16
||||| Relegated
|-
||2017–18
|2D
|align=right |8th
|align=right|42||align=right|16||align=right|16||align=right|10||align=right|44||align=right|34||alight=right|+10||align=right|64
||Third round
|||||
|-
||2018–19
|2D
|align=right bgcolor=gold|1st
|align=right|42||align=right|26||align=right|9||align=right|7||align=right|59||align=right|35||alight=right|+24||align=right|87
||Second round
||||| Promoted
|-
||2019–20
|1D
|align=right |10th
|align=right|38||align=right|13||align=right|13||align=right|12||align=right|46||align=right|54||alight=right|−8||align=right|52
||Round of 16
|||||
|-
||2020–21
|1D
|align=right |11th
|align=right|38||align=right|11||align=right|11||align=right|16||align=right|37||align=right|48||alight=right|−11||align=right|44
||Round of 16
|||||
|-
||2021–22
|1D
|align=right |10th
|align=right|38||align=right|12||align=right|11||align=right|15||align=right|37||align=right|51||alight=right|−14||align=right|47
||Round of 32
|||||
|}

Season to season

41 seasons in La Liga
37 seasons in Segunda División
13 seasons in Tercera División (as third tier)
1 season in Categorías Regionales

Current squad

First team squad
.

Reserve team

Out on loan

Current technical staff

Honours
Copa del Rey: 
 Runners-up (1): 2004-05,
Segunda División: 
 Winners (4): 1952–53, 1955–56, 1960–61, 2018–19
Tercera División:
 Winners (7): 1931–32, 1947–48, 1948–49, 1968–69, 1971–72, 1974–75, 1976–77

Notable players
Note: this list includes players that have appeared in at least 100 league games and/or have reached international status.

World Cup players
The following players have been selected by their country in the World Cup Finals, while playing for Osasuna.

  Savo Milošević (2006)
  Francisco Silva (2014)
  Ante Budimir (2022)
  Ez Abde (2022)

Famous coaches
 Javier Aguirre
 Ivica Brzić
 Rafael Benítez
 José Antonio Camacho
 Miguel Ángel Lotina
 José Luis Mendilibar
 José Ángel Ziganda
 Jagoba Arrasate

Women's football

See also
 CA Osasuna B – Osasuna's B team in Segunda División B
 CD Subiza – affiliated team in Tercera División RFEF
 CA Osasuna cantera – youth system up to 19 years, in leagues including División de Honor Juvenil
 Xota FS – affiliated futsal club
 Corruption in Navarre

References

External links

Official website 
Futbolme team profile 
BDFutbol team profile

 
Football clubs in Navarre
Association football clubs established in 1920
Sport in Pamplona
1920 establishments in Spain
La Liga clubs
Segunda División clubs